Solomon Adesanya (born July 12, 1985) is an American businessman and a politician. He was elected on November 8, 2022, in the 2022 US midterm elections. Adesanya is a Democrat who won the election in his first attempt to the Georgia House of Representatives. His constituents in the 43rd District cover mainly Marietta and a small part of Northwest Atlanta. Solomon Adesanya won the seat in a district historically held by a Republican. Solomon Adesanya succeed Sharon Cooper, who now represents the 45th District due to reapportionment. Solomon assume office on January 9, 2023.

Personal life 
Solomon Adesanya is a second-generation American who lives in Marietta and often reflects on his immigrant father’s ideals which were of hope and a belief in the American dream. Solomon is of Nigerian descent. His father Olu Adesanya (1948–2009), came to the United States from Nigeria in 1971 as a student. Solomon’s father completed his undergraduate degree in Chemistry at the University of Illinois, Chicago and his Master’s degree at the University of Illinois, Springfield. His father lived between Lagos and Chicago during the 80s and early 90s. His older brother was born in Chicago, while Solomon and his immediate brother were born in Lagos. Solomon Adesanya grew up in Lagos and on the Southside of Chicago. He attended Georgia State University Masters of Public Policy. Solomon Adesanya is married with two daughters.

Business career
Solomon Adesanya is an entrepreneur, he owns two restaurants in Atlanta metro area. Kale Me Crazy Smyrna and Kale Me Crazy East Cobb. Adesanya also owns other small businesses. Adesanya laid his campaign platform on helping small businesses. He believes small business is the heart of the community. Solomon Adesanya estimated net worth is at $1.4 million.

References 

Democratic Party members of the Georgia House of Representatives
Living people
American politicians of Nigerian descent
1985 births